The IMOCA 60 Class yacht Spirit of Canada was designed by Owen Clark Design and launched in September 2006 after being made by first owner Derek Hatfield in Cobourg, Canada.

Racing results

Timeline

2006 Spirit of Canada

2008 Algimouss-Spirit of Canada

2015 O Canada

2020 EBAC

2022 Human Immobilier

References 

2000s sailing yachts
Sailing yachts designed by Owen Clarke Design
Sailing yachts designed by Merfyn Owen
Sailing yachts designed by Allen Clarke
Vendée Globe boats
IMOCA 60
Sailboat types built in Canada